FK Larvik was a Norwegian women's football club from Larvik, founded in 1997 through a merger of the women's football sections of Nanset IF and Halsen IF.

The senior team played in the Toppserien, the highest tier of Norwegian women's football, as late as in 2008. In March 2010, ahead of the 2010 season, the club dissolved after one year in the First Division and the club went defunct.

References

External links
 Official site
 NIFS.no

Association football clubs established in 1997
Association football clubs disestablished in 2010
Sport in Vestfold og Telemark
Larvik
Defunct women's football clubs in Norway
1997 establishments in Norway
2010 disestablishments in Norway